Kermit the Frog is a Muppet character created and originally performed by Jim Henson. Introduced in 1955, Kermit serves as the everyman protagonist of numerous Muppet productions, most notably Sesame Street and The Muppet Show, as well as in other television series, feature films, specials, and public service announcements through the years. He served as a mascot of The Jim Henson Company and appeared in various Henson projects.

Kermit performed the hit singles "Bein' Green" in 1970 for Sesame Street and "Rainbow Connection" in 1979 for The Muppet Movie, the first feature-length film featuring the Muppets. Kermit's original performance of "Rainbow Connection" reached No. 25 on the Billboard Hot 100 and was added to the Library of Congress's National Recording Registry in 2021. Henson performed Kermit until his death in 1990, and then Steve Whitmire performed Kermit from that time until his dismissal in 2016. Kermit has been performed by Matt Vogel from 2017. He was also voiced by Frank Welker in Muppet Babies and occasionally in other animation projects, and is voiced by Matt Danner in the 2018 reboot of Muppet Babies.

Kermit's look and voice have been recognizable in popular culture worldwide for many decades, and in 2006, the character was credited as the author of Before You Leap: A Frog's Eye View of Life's Greatest Lessons, an "autobiography" told from the perspective of the character himself.

History and development
Kermit the Frog first appeared on May 9, 1955, in the premiere of WRC-TV's Sam and Friends. This prototype Kermit was created from a discarded turquoise spring coat belonging to Jim Henson's mother and two ping pong ball halves for eyes.

Initially, Kermit was a vague lizard-like creature. He subsequently made a number of television appearances before his status as a frog was established in the television special Hey, Cinderella! in 1969. His triangular-pointed collar was added at the time to make him seem more frog-like and to conceal the seam between his head and body. According to Michael K. Frith, the relatively simple construction of the Kermit puppet allows the performer's arm and hand to produce a wide range of expression and gestures.

Naming
The origin of Kermit's name is a subject of some debate. It is often claimed that Kermit was named after Henson's childhood friend Kermit Scott, from Leland, Mississippi. However, Karen Falk, head archivist and board of directors member for the Jim Henson Legacy organization, denies this claim on the Jim Henson Company's website:

Joy DiMenna, the only daughter of Kermit Kalman Cohen who worked as a sound engineer at WBAL-TV during Jim Henson's time with Sam and Friends, recalls that the puppet was named after her father. According to Kermit Cohen's obituary, as well as DiMenna and Lenny Levin, a colleague of Mr. Cohen's at WBAL:

Another common belief is that Kermit was named for Kermit Love, who worked with Henson in designing and constructing Muppets, particularly on Sesame Street, but Love's association with Henson did not begin until well after Kermit's creation and naming, and he always denied any connection between his name and that of the character.

As Sesame Street is localized for some different markets that speak languages other than English, Kermit is often renamed. In Portugal, he is called Cocas, o Sapo (sapo means "toad"), and in Brazil, his name is similar: Caco, o Sapo. In most of Hispanic America, his name is la rana René (René the Frog), while in Spain, he is named Gustavo. In the Arabic version, he is known as Kamel, which is a common Arabic male name that means "perfect". In Hungary, he is called Breki (onomatopoetic).

Characterization and performers
Jim Henson originated the character in 1955 on his local television series, Sam and Friends. Henson himself described Kermit as "kind of easy-going, very likable...sometimes slightly a wiseguy." Frank Oz remarked that Kermit possesses a natural sense of leadership within the Muppets, explaining that "he has all these zany characters and a world around him and he tries to be the center and hold everything together...sometimes he gets too much and blows his top, but essentially he kind of goes with the flow." Brian Henson described his father's performance as Kermit as "coming out of his own personality—was a wry intelligence, a little bit of a naughtiness, but Kermit always loved everyone around and also loved a good prank."

Kermit has often been referred to as Henson's "soft-spoken alter-ego." Many of Henson's colleagues have confirmed how close and inseparable Jim and Kermit's personalities were. Henson's agent Bernie Brillstein has stated  straightforwardly that "Kermit was Jim". Author Brian Jay Jones described the relationship accordingly: "The more Jim performed Kermit, the more the two of them seemed to become intertwined…it was becoming harder to tell where the frog ended and Jim began." Henson continued to perform the character until his death in 1990. Henson's last known performance as Kermit was for an appearance on The Arsenio Hall Show to promote the television special The Muppets at Walt Disney World. Henson died twelve days after that appearance.

Following Henson's death, veteran Muppet performer Steve Whitmire was named Kermit's new performer. Whitmire claims that Henson had seemingly intended to pass on the role to him before he died, though it was Jane Henson and son Brian who had selected him after her father's death. Whitmire's first public performance as Kermit was at the end of the television special The Muppets Celebrate Jim Henson in 1990. Whitmire explained that his main intent when he inherited Kermit "was to make sure the character stayed the same and consistent, but didn't become stale and just a copy." 

Kermit's personality during Whitmire's tenure was widely described as more wholesome, lighthearted, and Pollyanna-ish than Henson's. Several critics of Whitmire's portrayal have come from the Henson family. Brian Henson stated that while Whitmire's performance was "sometimes excellent, and always pretty good", he also elaborated that "Kermit has, as a character, flattened out over time and has become too square and not as vital as it should have been." Cheryl Henson stated that Whitmire performed the character as a "bitter, angry, depressed, victim". He remained Kermit's principal performer until October 2016, when he was dismissed by The Muppets Studio. The Walt Disney Company (owner of The Muppets Studio) cited "unacceptable business conduct" as reason for the dismissal, while Whitmire claims the decision was made due to creative disagreements over Kermit's characterization and prolonged labor union negotiations that delayed his involvement in Muppet productions.

Disney announced that Matt Vogel would become Kermit's new performer on July 10, 2017. Vogel's first official appearance as Kermit was in a "Muppet Thought of the Week” YouTube video.

John Kennedy performed Kermit for Muppets Ahoy!, a 2006 Disney Cruise Line stage show (though Whitmire performed Kermit for the first few shows). Muppet performer Artie Esposito briefly performed Kermit in 2009 for a few personal appearances (an appearance on America's Got Talent, the MTV Video Music Awards, and at the 2009 D23 Expo). Voice actor Frank Welker provided the voice of Baby Kermit on the animated Saturday morning cartoon, Muppet Babies. He also provided the voice of an adult Kermit for a short-lived spin-off, Little Muppet Monsters. Brian Cummings voiced Kermit in a 1995 CBS promotion. Wally Wingert provided the voice of Baby Kermit in a Muppet Babies CD-ROM. Matt Danner voices Baby Kermit on the 2018 reboot of Muppet Babies.

Character biography 

A biography has been developed for Kermit the Frog as if he were an actual living performer rather than a puppet character. According to this fictional biography, he was born in Leland, Mississippi, alongside approximately 2,353 siblings, though a 2011 "interview" on The Ellen DeGeneres Show has him state that he was from the swamps of Louisiana.

As portrayed in the 2002 film Kermit's Swamp Years, at the age of 12, he was the first of his siblings to leave the swamp and one of the first frogs to talk to humans. He is shown in the film encountering a 12-year-old Jim Henson (played by Christian Kriebel) for the first time.

According to The Muppet Movie, Kermit returned to the swamp, where a passing agent (Dom DeLuise) noted he had talent. Thus inspired, Kermit headed to Hollywood, encountering the rest of the Muppets along the way. Together, they were given a standard "rich and famous" contract by Lew Lord (Orson Welles) of Wide World Studios and began their showbiz careers. In Before You Leap, Kermit again references encountering Jim Henson sometime after the events depicted in the course of The Muppet Movie and details their friendship and their partnership in the entertainment industry, crediting Henson as being the individual to whom he owes his fame. At some point after the events of The Muppet Movie, Kermit and the other Muppets begin The Muppet Show, and the characters remain together as a group, before starring in the other Muppet films and Muppets Tonight, with Kermit usually at the core of the stories as the lead protagonist. Kermit is shown in The Muppet Movie as stating that the events of the film are "approximately how it happened" when asked by his nephew Robin about how the Muppets got started.

Fozzie Bear is portrayed as Kermit's best friend—a fact reiterated by Kermit in Before You Leap—and the two were frequently seen together during sketches on The Muppet Show and in other Muppet-related media and merchandise.

On August 4, 2015, Kermit the Frog and Miss Piggy "announced" that they had ended their romantic relationship. On September 2, 2015, Kermit was stated to have found a new girlfriend, a pig named Denise, but around February 2016, Denise supposedly broke up with Kermit after almost six months together.

Career
Kermit has been featured prominently on both The Muppet Show and Sesame Street. However, he had a prominent career before Sesame Streets debut in 1969, as he starred in Sam and Friends, and numerous Muppets made guest appearances on Today from 1961 and The Ed Sullivan Show from 1966.

Sesame Street
Kermit was one of the original main Muppet characters on Sesame Street. Closely identified with the show, Kermit usually appeared as a lecturer on simple topics, a straight man to another Muppet foil (usually Grover, Herry Monster or Cookie Monster), or a news reporter interviewing storybook characters for Sesame Street News. He sang many songs on the show, including "Bein' Green", and appeared in the 1998 video The Best of Kermit on Sesame Street.

Unlike the rest of the show's Muppets, Kermit was never the property of Sesame Workshop and has rarely been a part of the show's merchandise. When Sesame Workshop bought full ownership of its characters from The Jim Henson Company for $180 million, Kermit was excluded from the deal. The character now belongs to The Muppets Studio, a division of The Walt Disney Company. His first Sesame Street appearance since Disney ownership was in an Elmo's World segment in the show's 40th-season premiere on November 10, 2009. His most recent appearance was in the 2019 television special Sesame Street's 50th Anniversary Celebration, where he performed "Bein' Green" with Elvis Costello.

With the Muppets
In The Muppet Show television series, Kermit was the central character, the showrunner, and the long-suffering stage manager of the theater show, trying to keep order amidst the chaos created by the other Muppets. Henson once claimed that Kermit's job on the Muppet Show was much like his own: "trying to get a bunch of crazies to actually get the job done." It was on this show that the running gag of Kermit being pursued by leading lady Miss Piggy developed.

On Muppets Tonight, Kermit was still a main character, although he was the producer rather than frontman. He appeared in many parody sketches such as NYPD Green, City Schtickers, Flippers, and The Muppet Odd Squad, as well as in the Psychiatrist's Office sketch.

Kermit also served as the mascot for The Jim Henson Company, until the sale of the Muppet characters to Disney. A Kermit puppet can be seen at the National Museum of American History.

Kermit appears in Muppet*Vision 3D, an attraction that opened in 1991 and continues to run presently at Disney's Hollywood Studios at Walt Disney World in Lake Buena Vista, Florida. The character was also formerly featured in the aforementioned attraction in Disney California Adventure Park at the Disneyland Resort in Anaheim, California until its closure in 2014. Kermit also appeared in The Muppets Present...Great Moments in American History at the Magic Kingdom from 2016 to 2020. He also appeared in two parades; Disney Stars and Motor Cars Parade which ran at Disney's Hollywood Studios from 2001 to 2008 and Disney's Honorary VoluntEars Cavalcade which was held during 2010 at the Magic Kingdom and Disneyland.

Filmography
Kermit the Frog has appeared in almost every Muppet production, as well as making guest appearances in other shows and movies.

Below is a list of his more well-known appearances:

 Sam and Friends (1955–1961) (TV)
 Sesame Street (1969–1990, 1996–2001, 2009, 2019) (TV)
 Hey, Cinderella! (1969) (TV)
 The Muppets on Puppets (1970) (TV)
 The Frog Prince (1971) (TV)
 The Muppet Musicians of Bremen (1972) (TV)
 The Muppets Valentine Show (1974) (TV)
 The Muppet Show: Sex and Violence (1975) (TV)
 The Muppet Show (1976–1981) (TV)
 Emmet Otter's Jug-Band Christmas (1977) (TV)
 The Muppet Movie (1979)
 The Great Muppet Caper (1981)
 The Muppets Take Manhattan (1984)
 Muppet Babies (1984–1991) (TV)
 Sesame Street Presents Follow That Bird (1985)
 The Muppets: A Celebration of 30 Years (1986) (TV)
 The Christmas Toy (1986) (TV)
 A Muppet Family Christmas (1987) (TV)
 The Jim Henson Hour (1989) (TV)
 Cartoon All-Stars to the Rescue (1990) (TV)
 The Muppets at Walt Disney World (1990) (TV)
 The Muppets Celebrate Jim Henson (1990) (TV)
 The Muppet Christmas Carol (1992) – Appearance as Bob Cratchit
 Muppet Classic Theater (1994) (Direct-to-Video) – Appearance as King Midas and the King in Rumpelstiltskin.
 Muppet Treasure Island (1996) – Appearance as Captain Abraham Smollett
 Muppets Tonight (1996–1998) (TV)
 Muppets from Space (1999)
 The Jerry Lewis MDA Labor Day Telethon (2001) (TV)
 Kermit's Swamp Years (2002) (Direct-to-Video)
 It's a Very Merry Muppet Christmas Movie (2002) (TV)
 Saturday Night Live (1975/76, 2004, 2011) (TV)
 The Muppets' Wizard of Oz (2005) (TV) – Appearance as himself and The Scarecrow
 Mr. Magorium's Wonder Emporium (2007) (cameo)
 Studio DC: Almost Live (2008) (TV)
 A Muppets Christmas: Letters to Santa (2008) (TV)
 The Muppets (2011)
 "30 Rock (2012) - Appearance as himself in "My Whole Life Is Thunder"
 Good Luck Charlie (2013) (TV) – Appearance as himself in "Duncan Dream House"
 Lady Gaga and the Muppets Holiday Spectacular (2013) (TV)
 Muppets Most Wanted (2014)
 The Muppets (2015–2016) (TV)
 Muppet Babies (2018–2022) (TV)
 Sesame Street's 50th Anniversary Celebration (2019) (TV)
 Muppets Now (2020) (TV)
 Amphibia (2020) (TV) – Appearance as the voice of Crumpet the Frog in "Swamp and Sensibility"
 The Masked Singer (2021) (TV) – The Snail
 Muppets Haunted Mansion (2021) (TV) – Appearance as himself and a Ghost

Cultural impact

Accolades and commemorations
 Kermit was awarded an honorary doctorate of Amphibious Letters on May 19, 1996, at Southampton College, New York, where he also gave a commencement speech. He is also the only "amphibian" to have had the honor of addressing the Oxford Union. A statue of Henson and Kermit was erected on the campus of Henson's alma mater, the University of Maryland, College Park in 2003.

Kermit was also given the honor of being the Grand Marshal of the Tournament of Roses Parade in 1996. The Macy's Thanksgiving Day Parade has featured a Kermit balloon since 1977.

On November 14, 2002, Kermit the Frog received a star on the Hollywood Walk of Fame. The star is located at 6801 Hollywood Blvd. Kermit has two stars on the Walk of Fame, the other as a member of the collective The Muppets.

On Kermit's 50th birthday in 2005, the United States Postal Service released a set of new stamps with photos of Kermit and some of his fellow Muppets on them. The background of the stamp sheet features a photo of a silhouetted Henson sitting in a window well, with Kermit sitting in his lap looking at him.

Kermit was also the grand marshal for Michigan State University's homecoming parade in 2006.

In 2013, the original Kermit puppet from Sam and Friends was donated to the Smithsonian Institution in Washington, D.C. for display in the pop culture gallery. In 2015, the Leland Chamber of Commerce in Leland, Mississippi opened a small museum containing puppets and memorabilia dedicated to Kermit.

Kermit's legacy is also deeply entrenched in the science community. One of the famous WP-3D Orion research platforms flown by the NOAA Hurricane Hunters is named after Kermit.  The other is named after Miss Piggy. In 2015, the discovery of the Costa Rican glass frog Hyalinobatrachium dianae also attracted viral media attention due to the creature's perceived resemblance to Kermit, with researcher Brian Kubicki quoted as saying "I am glad that this species has ended up getting so much international attention, and in doing so it is highlighting the amazing amphibians that are native to Costa Rica and the need to continue exploring and studying the country's amazing tropical forests".

Guest television appearances

Kermit has made numerous guest appearances on popular television shows, including co-hosting individual episodes of a number of long-running talk shows; among other television media. On April 2, 1979, Kermit guest-hosted The Tonight Show Starring Johnny Carson to promote The Muppet Movie. From 1983 to 1995, the French political satire show Le Bébête Show used copies of various Muppets to parody key political figures, and Kermit renamed "Kermitterrand", embodied President François Mitterrand. On May 21, 2018, Kermit and contestant Maddie Poppe performed "Rainbow Connection" live on American Idol.

A still photo of Kermit sitting in his Director's chair with his megaphone in his hand from The Muppet Show appeared on a technical difficulties telop graphic on Metromedia owned-and-operated station KTTV Channel 11 in Los Angeles during the late 1970s and early 1980s.

As an April Fool's joke, Kermit hosted CNN's Larry King Live in 1994 and interviewed Hulk Hogan. Kermit was also a semi-regular during various incarnations of Hollywood Squares, with other Muppets such as Big Bird and Oscar the Grouch also making appearances on the original Hollywood Squares. 

In 2020, Kermit appeared on Monday Night Football with other Muppets characters as it was briefly rebranded "Muppet Night Football."

On March 10, 2021, Kermit was the first celebrity to be unmasked on the fifth season of The Masked Singer, having performed in costume as "Snail".

Merchandising
Jim Henson's characters, including the Muppets, have inspired merchandise internationally, with Chris Bensch, chief curator of Rochester, New York's The Strong National Museum of Play, reporting "There seems to have been a particular craze for Kermit the Frog in Japan," likely due to the "cuteness appeal". Baby Kermit plush toys became popular in the 1980s after the success of Muppet Babies. In 1991, one year after Jim Henson died, merchandise featuring Kermit and other Muppet characters was being sold at Disney theme parks, causing Henson Associates to file a lawsuit against Disney for copyright infringement. 

Henson alleged that the "counterfeit merchandise" falsely indicated that the characters belonged to Disney, although the latter company had the right to exercise use of the characters due to an earlier licensing agreement. The Henson Associates highlighted a T-shirt displaying Kermit, the Disney brand, and a copyright symbol. Disney representative Erwin Okun said the lawsuit was "outrageous" and "an unfortunate break with the legacy of a fine relationship with Disney that Jim Henson left behind". Disney later acquired the Muppets, and thusly, clothes, toys and souvenirs depicting Kermit and the Muppets continued to be sold at Disney theme parks and stores.

The Leland Chamber of Commerce's small Kermit-themed museum set out to preserve some of the dolls and merchandise. In 2016, The New Zealand Herald reported a hat featuring Kermit sipping Lipton tea, associated with the "But That's None of My Business" Internet meme, became a popular seller after basketball player LeBron James drew attention for wearing one.

Kermit in Internet culture
In March 2007, Sad Kermit, an unofficial parody, was uploaded to the website YouTube, showing a store-bought Kermit puppet performing a version of the Nine Inch Nails song "Hurt" in a style similar to Johnny Cash's famous cover version. In contrast to the real Kermit character's usual family-friendly antics, the video shows the puppet engaging in drug abuse, smoking, alcoholism, performing oral sex on Rowlf the Dog, smashing a picture of Miss Piggy (with a breast exposed) and attempting suicide. The video became an Internet meme. The Victoria Times Colonist called it an "online sensation". The Chicago Sun-Times said it "puts the high in 'Hi-ho!'" The London Free Press said "Sad Kermit is in a world of pain". The Houston Press described it as the "world's most revolting web phenomenon". SF Weekly described the unauthorized video as "ironic slandering". Clips have been featured on the Canadian television series The Hour, where host George Stroumboulopoulos speculated that the Kermit version of "Hurt" was inspired by the Cash version rather than that of Nine Inch Nails.

Kermit has also appeared in a popular meme in which he is shown sipping tea, "one used when you sassily point something out, and then slyly back away, claiming that it's not [your] business". The photo is taken from "Be More Kermit," a Lipton advertisement that aired in 2014, and was adapted into the "But That's None of My Business" meme by African American comedians on the Tumblr blog Kermit the Snitch, making appearances on Twitter, Instagram and Facebook. Charles Pulliam-Moore of the TV station Fusion praised "But That's None of My Business" as "a symbol for the comedic brilliance born out of black communities on the internet", but Stephanie Hayes of Bustle magazine criticized the memes as racist and obscene.

In 2016, a Good Morning America post on Twitter referred to the "But That's None of My Business" meme as "Tea Lizard", becoming the subject of viral online derision. New York magazine replied that, "Kermit is a frog. A frog is an amphibian. A lizard is a reptile. It's just so insulting. Beyond a frog and a lizard both being clearly ectothermic, they couldn't be any more different. Not all green things are the same, you ignorant bastards". Popular Science also addressed the misnomer, writing "Frogs, which are amphibians, have quite a few significant differences from reptiles in how they breathe, their life cycles, whether they have scales or not... there's a lot to absorb here."

In November 2016, a new meme surfaced of Kermit talking to a hooded version of himself which represents the self and its dark inner thoughts. It involves captioning of a screenshot taken from the Muppets Most Wanted movie of Kermit and Constantine looking at each other. In the meme, Constantine is supposed to represent a Sith Lord from Star Wars.

References

External links

 Kermit the Frog's character profile at Disney.com
 Kermit's commencement address at Southampton College in 1996
 Birthplace of the Frog: An Exhibit of Jim Henson's Delta Boyhood
  (as himself)
 Kermit the Frog on IMDb

 
Fictional characters from Mississippi
Television characters introduced in 1955
Mascots introduced in 1955
Anthropomorphic amphibians
Fictional frogs
Fictional left-handed character
Fictional producers
Fictional reporters
Fictional singers
Fictional string musicians
Frog mascots
Television mascots
Corporate mascots
Sesame Street Muppet characters
The Muppets characters
Internet memes
Film and television memes